This is a list of Thai provinces and regions by GDP and GDP per capita as of 2019, based on Gross Regional and Provincial Product
Chain Volume Measures 2019 Edition, According to Office of the National Economic and Social Development Council (NESDC).

Data for 2019 estimates (US$ at 2019 average market exchange rate, international $ (I$) using 2019 PPP conversion factor from World Bank)

See also 
 List of ASEAN country subdivisions by GDP

References

Provinces by GPP
Gross state product
GPP
GPP
Thailand

https://data.worldbank.org/indicator/NY.GDP.PCAP.PP.CD?locations=TH
https://www.nesdc.go.th/ewt_dl_link.php?nid=5628&filename=gross_regional
https://www.nesdc.go.th/more_news.php?cid=833&filename=index